Odessa Turner (born October 12, 1964) is a former professional American football wide receiver in the National Football League for seven seasons for the New York Giants and the San Francisco 49ers.  He played college football at Northwestern State University and was drafted in the fourth round of the 1987 NFL Draft.

Turner also played for the Ottawa Rough Riders of the Canadian Football League after his NFL career.

References 

1964 births
Living people
American football wide receivers
New York Giants players
Northwestern State Demons football players
Ottawa Rough Riders players
Players of American football from Louisiana
San Francisco 49ers players
Sportspeople from Monroe, Louisiana